Fabien Barrillon (born 9 April 1988) is a French professional footballer who plays as a defender for Marignane Gignac.

Club career
Barrillon began his career as a youth player for Olympique de Marseille. After several seasons playing for Marseille's reserve team, he joined Cassis Carnoux in 2009. The upcoming year he was transferred to Istres, which he also captained, spending four years there. In June 2014, he was about to sign with Romanian side Petrolul Ploiești, moving abroad for the first time, but after it was discovered that he had some medical problems, the transfer broke down.

In June 2019, Barrillon joined Marignane Gignac.

References

External links

foot-national.com profile

1988 births
Living people
People from Aubagne
Sportspeople from Bouches-du-Rhône
French footballers
Association football defenders
Olympique de Marseille players
SO Cassis Carnoux players
FC Istres players
Nîmes Olympique players
US Créteil-Lusitanos players
Athlético Marseille players
FC Annecy players
Marignane Gignac Côte Bleue FC players
Ligue 2 players
Championnat National players
Footballers from Provence-Alpes-Côte d'Azur